PSEG may refer to:
 Public Service Enterprise Group, a utility company
 UDP-2,4-diacetamido-2,4,6-trideoxy-beta-L-altropyranose hydrolase, an enzyme